Bend over or Bend Ova may refer to:

 "Bück dich", a German song by Rammstein
 "Bend Ova", a 2000 song by Phife Dawg from the album Ventilation: Da LP
 "Bend Ova", a 2014 song by Lil Jon and Tyga
 "Bend Over", a 2001 song on the album Musipal by Wagon Christ
 Bend over, a slang "to twerk"

See also
 Ben Dover (born 1955), an English pornographic actor
 Ben Dover (Virginia), a national historic district in Virginia